Birkenstock Group B.V. & Co. KG is a German shoe manufacturer known for its production of Birkenstocks, a German brand of sandals and other shoes notable for their contoured cork footbeds (soles) made with layers of suede and jute, which conform to the shape of their wearers' feet.

Founded in 1774 by Johann Adam Birkenstock and headquartered in Neustadt (Wied), Rhineland-Palatinate, Germany, the company's original purpose was to create shoes that support and contour the foot, compared to the flat soles of many shoes during that time. In 1896 the Fussbett (footbed) was designed, and by 1925, Birkenstocks were sold all over Europe.

In 1966, Margot Fraser first brought Birkenstocks to America. In the US, they were sold in health stores, thus becoming associated with hippies in the 1970s.

In 2015, the EVA, a rubber sandal made from ethylene-vinyl acetate, was created as a cheaper alternative to the original cork Birkenstock.

Various fashion designers have used Birkenstocks. Phoebe Philo created one of the better known designs for Celine. Composed of Birkenstock's Arizona and a mink covered footbed, the sandal is commonly called the "Furkenstock".

In February 2021, L Catterton, the private equity firm backed by Bernard Arnault's LVMH, said it had agreed to buy the German footwear group Birkenstock in a deal that valued the company at about €4bn.

History

Early years 

The Birkenstock brand traces its roots to Johann Adam Birkenstock, registered in 1774 as a "vassal and shoemaker" in local church archives in the small Hessian village of Langen-Bergheim. In 1896, Johann's great-great-grandson Konrad Birkenstock developed the first contoured insole for use by shoemakers in the production of custom footwear. Also in the year 1896, Konrad created the Fussbett (footbed) and opened two shoe stores in Frankfurt, Germany, where he continued to make and sell his insoles. The Birkenstock company created many educational courses to help spread awareness of the benefits of its shoes; in 1947, Konrad's son, Carl Birkenstock, wrote the book "Podiatry-The Carl Birkenstock System"—one of many books released by Birkenstock. The year 1902 saw the development of the first flexible arch-support for insertion into factory-made shoes, and in 1964, Karl Birkenstock developed these inserts into a shoe — thus producing the original prototype of the Birkenstock sandal.  In 1925 Konrad Birkenstock expanded the company by buying a large factory in Friedberg, Hesse.  After World War II (1939–1945), the Birkenstock sandal was popular among returning soldiers because of the orthopedic support.  Starting in 1963 and continuing into 1964 Karl Birkenstock released his first athletic sandal with a flexible footbed called Madrid. The shoe was constructed so that the wearer would have to grip their toes to keep the sandals on; this resulted in toning the calf muscle, which became quite useful to athletes, especially among gymnasts.

Margot Fraser and introduction to U.S. 

In 1966, Margot Fraser, a German dressmaker who resided in California, decided to travel back to Germany to visit a spa in Bavaria, where she was recommended Madrids to help with a foot ailment caused by tight shoes. Due to Fraser's relief from her foot condition and her enthusiasm for the sandals, Birkenstocks were introduced in the United States—though some hurdles stood in the way of their eventual acceptance by American buyers.  Many shoe stores rejected the sandals due to their appearance, leading Fraser to health stores near the granola section. The 1970s brought a spike in sales.
In the United States, Birkenstocks were first popular among young men and later on among flower children, a group traditionally associated with American liberalism. The shoe became popular with hippies and others who had a "back to nature" philosophy and appreciated the natural foot shape and foot-friendly comfort of Birkenstocks. In 1973, Birkenstock's most popular sandal, Arizona, was introduced.

Expansion and present-day 
Fraser founded a trading company named Birkenstock Footprint Sandals, Inc., in Novato, California. Renamed Birkenstock Distribution USA, Inc. (BDUSA) in 2005, the company remained until 2007 the exclusive importer and distributor of Birkenstock name-brand products in the United States. In 2007 the owners of Birkenstock Orthopädie GmbH & Co. KG purchased their long-standing distribution partner BDUSA.

In 1986 Nordstrom became the first department store to sell Birkenstock sandals. In the early 1990s, "Birks" enjoyed another spike in sales among high-school and college-aged Generation Xers, in part due to the introduction of Birkenstocks into High Fashion, most notably, Kate Moss. Birkenstocks continued to spread to Britain in the early 2000s due to headlines of Gwyneth Paltrow, who was spotted wearing them. Birkenstocks saw another comeback among teens and young adults in the early 2010s, as well as in the late 2010s due in part to the VSCO girl trend. During the 2004 U.S. presidential primary, some conservatives derided Howard Dean's supporters as "Birkenstock liberals".

In 2018, the company was given PETA's Libby Award for being the "Most Animal-Friendly Shoe Company."

High fashion 
In 2012 Birkenstocks were spotted on a Céline runway in Paris. Called "Furkenstocks", this recreation of the Arizona sandal incorporated a mink-covered footbed. Many other designers have also created their version of the sandal, including Giambattista Valli and Givenchy.

In 2019 Valentino collaborated with Birkenstock to create their version of the sandal featured at Men's Paris Fashion Week.

On June 3, 2021, the Birkenstock Group announced a collaboration with fashion designer Rick Owens. Starting on June 4 of that year, interpretations of the Arizona and Boston models were released. A new Rotterdam style was also presented and released for sale.

Production 

The original footbed of the Birkenstock shoe was created in the 1930s and possesses four different layers that complete the shoe.  The first layer of the shoe is the shock-absorbent sole, followed by a layer of jute fibers, a firm cork footbed, and another layer of jute. The last layer is the footbed line which is a soft suede.

In addition to the original footbed, Birkenstock gives the option of a soft footbed. The shoe is made of the same materials as the original footbed, with the addition of a foam insert placed under the suede lining.

Birkenstock has also introduced a lightweight, waterproof shoe called the Birkenstock EVA, made of a material called Ethylene-Vinyl-Acetate or EVA.

References

External links

 
 https://www.mein-outlet.com/outlets/birkenstock-outlet/ List of all Birkenstock outlets in Germany

Companies established in 1774
Goods manufactured in Germany
German brands
Sandals
Shoe brands
Shoe companies of Germany
2021 mergers and acquisitions